Ciqikou Station is an interchange station between Line 5 and Line 7 of the Beijing Subway.

Station Layout 
Both the line 5 and 7 stations have underground island platforms.

There are 5 exits, lettered A, D, F1, G, and H. Exits A and F1 are accessible.

Gallery

References

External links
 

Beijing Subway stations in Dongcheng District
Railway stations in China opened in 2007